The Tomb of Li Shou (Chinese: 李壽墓, Lĭ Shòu mù, Li Shou was also named Li Shentong (李神通), 557-630 CE) was a tomb with slopes access and vertical shafts dating to 630 CE during the early Tang dynasty. Li Shou was a cousin of Emperor Gaozu of Tang.

The tomb was excavated in 1973 in Sanyuan County, about 40 kilometers north of Xi'an, Shaanxi Province, and contained numerous artifacts, including glass utensils. The sarcophagus is now located in the Beilin Museum, Xi'an, including an epitaph in the shape of a tortoise shell.

Gallery

References

640 deaths
Tang dynasty people